Zacorisca poecilantha is a species of moth of the family Tortricidae. It is found on the Maluku Islands of Indonesia, where it has been recorded from Buru.

The wingspan is about 28 mm. The forewings are deep indigo blue, with a broad irregular-edged yellow-whitish basal fascia, leaving the base of the dorsum dark blue. The costal fold is dark blue with a yellow-whitish interior and there is an oblique transverse yellow-whitish spot in the disc, as well as a rosy-ochreous irregular-edged fascia from beneath the costa to near the termen above the tornus. The hindwings are deep purple.

References

	

Moths described in 1924
Zacorisca